The Role ( Rol) is a 2013 Russian drama film directed by Konstantin Lopushansky and starring Maksim Sukhanov. It tells the story of an actor who begins to act as his doppelgänger, a revolutionary leader in the newly established Soviet Russia. The film is in black and white.

It was shown in competition at the 35th Moscow International Film Festival. It received the Nika Award for Best Screenplay.

Cast
 Maksim Sukhanov as Nikolai Yevlakhov
 Aleksandr Efremov as Igrok
 Anna Geller as Spiridonov's Wife
 Yuriy Itskov as Odintsov, Smuggler
 Maria Järvenhelmi as Amalia
 Boris Kamorzin as Grigoriy
 Leonid Mozgovoy as Uhov
 Vasiliy Reutov as The Officer from the Train
 Anastasiya Sheveleva as Olga
 Dmitriy Sutyrin as Spiridonov

References

2010s historical drama films
Films directed by Konstantin Lopushansky
Films set in Saint Petersburg
Russian historical drama films
2010s Russian-language films
2013 drama films
2013 films